Irwin I. Kimmelman (September 10, 1930 – September 12, 2014, Newark, New Jersey) was a politician who served in both houses of the New Jersey Legislature and served as the Attorney General of New Jersey from 1982 – 1986.

Biography
Kimmelman graduated from Weequahic High School and studied accounting at the Rutgers University School of Business Administration, graduating in 1952. He entered Harvard Law School, where he won the Roscoe Pound Prize for brief writing and oral argument, and graduated in 1955. He was admitted to the New Jersey Bar the following year after a clerkship with Superior Court Judge Edward Gaulkin.

Kimmelman served in the New Jersey General Assembly for one term, from 1964 to 1966. He was an unsuccessful candidate for State Senator in 1965.

1965 Essex County State Senator general election results

He was a New Jersey Superior Court judge from May 1971 through September 1976, when he resigned to return to private law practice. He represented Thomas Kean during the recount for the 1981 gubernatorial election. After Kean won the recount, he announced his choice of Kimmelman as Attorney General on December 14, 1981. 
A resident of the Short Hills section of Millburn Township, Kimmelman was confirmed by the New Jersey Senate and sworn in on January 19, 1982, the day of Kean's inauguration.

Kimmelman returned to private practice in 1986 and was replaced by W. Cary Edwards. He would later return to the bench as a State Superior Court judge.

References

1930 births
2014 deaths
New Jersey Attorneys General
Republican Party members of the New Jersey General Assembly
New Jersey state court judges
Harvard Law School alumni
Rutgers University alumni
People from Millburn, New Jersey
Politicians from Newark, New Jersey
Lawyers from Newark, New Jersey
Weequahic High School alumni
20th-century American judges
20th-century American lawyers